Venturia carpophila is a species of fungus in the family Venturiaceae. A plant pathogen, it causes freckle, black spot, peach scab or black scab of peach. It has a cosmopolitan distribution. The species was described as new to science in 1961 by the Australian mycologist Eileen E. Fisher.

References 

Fungi described in 1966
Venturiaceae
Fungal plant pathogens and diseases
Stone fruit tree diseases